Limburg-Styrum-Bronchhorst-Borkelö was a family of the Netherlands of German extraction. It was partitioned from the Limburg-Styrum family in 1644. In 1766 it was partitioned into the Borkelö and Bronchhorst lines.

Counts of Limburg-Styrum-Bronchhorst-Borkelö (1644–1766)

House of Limburg
Counties of the Holy Roman Empire
House of Limburg-Stirum